Henry Butler, Lord of Umallia, founder of Burrishoole, died 1272.

Ancestry

Butler was a descendant of Theobald Walter, 1st Baron Butler, founder of the Butler dynasty of Ireland.

Theobald Butler, 4th Chief Butler of Ireland was a close relation. A later kinsman was James Butler, 1st Earl of Ormond.

Founder of Burrishoole

Butler participated in the invasion of Connacht under either Richard Mór de Burgh, 1st Baron of Connaught or his son, Walter de Burgh, 1st Earl of Ulster.

In 1272 he and Hosty ap Meurig were slain by Cathal, son of Conor Roe, and by the Clann-Murtough O'Conor. The latter family, the Clan Muircheartaigh Uí Conchobhair, were tenets of Butler but their uprising led to their expulsion.

In 1333, one John Butler held Henry's estates. After this date the family disappears from history. In the late 1500s, however, the then Earl of Ormond obtained the rights to Henry's estates by unknown means.

Annalistic reference

The Annals of the Four Masters state:

 1272. Henry Butler, Lord of Umallia, and Hosty Merrick, were slain by Cathal, son of Conor Roe, and by the Clann-Murtough O'Conor.

References
 History of Mayo, p. 300, Hubert T. Knox, 1908.

External links
http://www.ucc.ie/celt/published/T100005C/index.html

Normans in Ireland
People from County Mayo
13th-century Irish people